Di Lotti is a surname. Notable people with this surname include:

 Silvana Di Lotti (born 1942), Italian composer
 Vlasta Kálalová Di Lotti (1896–1971), Czech physician

See also

Lotti